Alpheus H. Favour (1880-1939) was an American politician from Arizona.  He served a four consecutive terms in the Arizona State Senate during the 7th through the 10th Arizona State Legislatures, holding one of the two seats from Yavapai County.

Biography
Favour was born in 1880.  He was the vice-president of the Bank of Arizona.  He was married to Eva Favour, and they had four children: Alpheus L., John, Catharine, and Mary.  In 1936, he wrote the definitive biography of the famous mountain man, Old Bill Williams, entitled, Old Bill Williams: Mountain Man.  In late November 1939, Favour went to the Mayo Clinic for treatment and observation.  While there, he developed streptococcus, which got progressively worse and resulted in his death on December 30, 1939, at the hospital in Rochester, New York.

References

Democratic Party Arizona state senators
Arizona politicians
20th-century American politicians
1880 births
1939 deaths